Ocellularia neoperforata is a rare species of corticolous (bark-dwelling) lichen in the family Graphidaceae. Found in Malaysia, it was formally described as a new species in 2002 by lichenologists Natsurang Homchantara and Brian J. Coppins. It is only known from the type collection at the type locality. The lichen has a shiny and smooth, greenish-grey thallus with a dense cortex and a white medulla. Its ascospores are trans-septate, narrowly ellipsoid, and measure 11–15 μm long. It contains fumarprotocetraric acid, a secondary compound. Ocellularia perforata is a lookalike species after which O. neoperforata is named. In contrast to the latter lichen, it has larger ascospores, less emergent apothecia, and contains protocetraric acid.

References

neoperforata
Lichen species
Lichens described in 2002
Lichens of Malaysia
Taxa named by Brian John Coppins
Taxa named by Natsurang Homchantara